Cairokee is an Egyptian rock band that was officially launched in 2003 but came to prominence with its revolutionary music following the Egyptian Revolution of 2011 due to its politically-inspired lyrics and protest songs released following the uprising. Their title song "Ya El Midan", featuring Egyptian singer Aida el Ayoubi who had previously retired in the 1990s, ranked number one on Facebook worldwide for downloads and number eight on YouTube with more than half a million views on the video channel in just two days following its internet release.

Background

The band consists of Amir Eid (lead vocalist), Sherif Hawary (lead guitarist), Tamer Hashem (drummer), Sherif Mostafa (keyboardist),  and Adam el-Alfy (bass guitarist). The initial band members were friends ever since their school days, and Tamer was already a drummer back then. In 2003, Eid and Hawary had started an English band initially called Black Star. They started playing covers of English songs, with only one Egyptian Masry song called "Ghariba" that was highly admired by their audiences. They later decided to continue making Egyptian songs because they felt it was shameful to keep playing English music as it wasn't their mother tongue. They were mainly influenced by the works of Pink Floyd and The Beatles and regard Pink Floyd's music as an inspiration for their own musical career.

Career
Following the 2011 revolution, they released their first major hit "Sout El Horeya" (The voice of freedom), a joint collaboration between the band's main vocalist Amir Eid and music producer, sound engineer and vocalist Hany Adel of the band Wust El-Balad. The song had over 2 million views on YouTube and was reportedly ranked a world record as one of the most watched videos in the shortest period of time. Another hit song, "Ya El Midan" (Oh you, the Square), marked the return of singer Aida el Ayoubi after 20 years of absence from the stage. The song was a tribute to Tahrir Square, addressing and personifying it as another living and breathing member of the opposition, and its video clip documented the latest protests in an indirect way as the camera was apparently filming inside a protester's house and it roamed over clothes riddled with bullet holes, medical white coats, onions and types vinegar (substances that defuse the effects of teargas) and the plastic shields of the CSF. On 24 January 2012, marking the first anniversary of the revolution, a video was released on YouTube for the song "Ethbat Makanak" (Hold your ground) and featured prominent Egyptian satirist Bassem Youssef who joined the work in order to support independent voices in the media who were attacked by the former military government because of their work. Cairokee released their first album "Matloob Zaeem" (Leader Wanted) in June 2011, with sponsorship from Coca-Cola after spending years without any support to release an album. The title track with the same name was an instant hit and was considered an employment advertisement preceding the 2012 presidential election, describing the qualities of the country's next leader in the producer's point of view. During the June 2013 Egyptian protests, they performed on a stage in front of hundreds of thousands who were protesting against President Mohamed Morsi at the country's main presidential palace in Cairo's Heliopolis suburb. The band was invited by volunteer organizers and had tweeted earlier that they would "join the Egyptian people at Ittihadiya (name of the palace)". While performing, the people were singing along with them and served as backup singers with lyrics such as "we are the people… and our path is right" and "you say ‘justice’, and they call you a traitor". The band called their audience during the performance "the best in the world".

On 21 March 2013, Red Bull organized an event in which Cairokee played against Wust El-Balad dubbed "Red Bull Sound Clash" where the spectators were the judge and the winner would be declared according to the intensity of the crowd's cheering. Daily News Egypt noted that "it was clear from the beginning of the evening that Cairokee had the edge on crowd support, although Wust El-Balad had a strong fan base at the event". The concert also featured popular sha'abi singer Ahmed Adaweyah who performed in Wust E-Balad's act and at the end of the event, no victor was announced but the spectators were apparently left highly satisfied with both performances. Cairokee also performed at the Jordanian Dum Tak Alternative Middle Eastern Music Festival, along with several Egyptian bands including Wust El-Balad and Massar Egbari as well as many other Middle Eastern bands such as Lebanon's Mashrou' Leila.

In early 2014, Cairokee released their third album "El Sekka Shemal". The album featured collaborations with different artists, including Algerian singer Souad Massi, Abdel Baset Hammouda and Zap Tharwat. This year also brought Cairokee to the record label Sony Music Middle East. The partnership led to the band obtaining its own Vevo channel on YouTube, the first deal of its kind for any artist in the region. The album was their most successful to date, with its first copy entirely sold out in the first three days only, topping the charts on the iTunes Store and in the music market of Egypt and the Middle East. It became the album with the highest number of downloads and purchases on iTunes by the end of the first week. It was also featured in the first episode of the third season of Bassem Youssef's highly popular show El Bernameg.

On July 20, 2017, Cairokee hit the summer season with the release of their latest album, Noaata Beda, or Drop of White, which consists of 10 songs. The main song, Noaata Beda, received 11 million views on YouTube.

Members
Amir Eid - Vocals, songs writer and acoustic guitar
Sherif El Hawary - Electric guitar
Tamer Hashem - Drums
Sherif Mostafa - Keyboards, mix and production
Adam El-Alfy - Bass guitar

Discography
Studio Albums
 Matloob Zaeem (مطلوب زعيم) (2011)
 Wana Maa Nafsy Aad (وانا مع نفسي قاعد) (2012)
 El Sekka Shemal (السكة شمال) (2014)
 Nas w Nas (ناس و ناس) (2015)
 Noaata Beida (2017) (نقطة بيضاء)
 The Ugly Ducklings (2019) (أبناء البطة السوداء)
 Roma (2022) (روما)

References

External links
 Official site
 Facebook
 Twitter
 Spotify

Egyptian musical groups
Egyptian rock music groups
Singers who perform in Egyptian Arabic